How to Start a Revolution is a Canadian documentary television series, which premiered in 2021 on CBC Gem. A two-part series based on the 2020 podcast Recall: How to Start a Revolution, the series explores the history of the Front de libération du Québec in the 1960s.

It won the Canadian Screen Award for Best History Documentary Program or Series at the 10th Canadian Screen Awards in 2022.

References

2021 web series debuts
2021 Canadian television series debuts
2020s Canadian documentary television series
Canadian non-fiction web series
CBC Gem original programming
Canadian Screen Award-winning television shows